Tigrane, o vero L'egual impegno d'amore e di fede (Tigranes or The Equal Ties of Love and Faith) is an opera seria in three acts by the Italian composer Alessandro Scarlatti with a libretto by Domenico Lalli (loosely based on the Histories of Herodotus). It was first performed at the Teatro San Bartolomeo, Naples, on 16 February 1715. It is regarded as one of Scarlatti's finest operas. As well as the serious main plot, there are also comic scenes involving the servants Dorilla and Orcone.

Roles

Synopsis

Act 1
Queen Tomiri (Tomyris in Herodotus) has two sons. One has been kidnapped and brought up as the Armenian prince, Tigrane. The other has been killed by Ciro, King of Persia. To avenge his death, Tomiri has fought and defeated Ciro with the aid of Policare and Doraspe. In return for their help, she has promised to marry one of them, but she is reluctant to come to a decision as she finds herself attracted to Tigrane, a commander in the allied army, unaware he is her son. Ciro's daughter, Meroe, is also in love with Tigrane and arrives at Tomiri's court in disguise, bent on avenging her father. Tomiri entrusts the choice of her husband to Tigrane, who says that whichever of the two kings can beat him in combat will win Tomiri's hand. Policare and Doraspe plot against Tigrane.

Act 2
Tomiri reconciles the two kings and Tigrane. Meroe is about to kill Tomiri as she sleeps when she is prevented by Tigrane. Tigrane, surprised with Meroe's dagger in his hand, is accused of trying to murder Tomiri. Unwilling to reveal the truth, which would endanger Meroe, Tigrane is condemned to death.

Act 3
As Tigrane faces execution, Meroe reveals her true identity. She is led away in chains and Tigrane is freed. The truth about Tigrane's parentage is finally discovered and Tomiri is reunited with her son. She pardons Meroe and allows her to marry Tigrane while the queen herself chooses Policare as her husband.

Recordings
Sinfonia, and arias "Il fiero aspetto", "Reo mi credi", "Esser degg'io come un scoglio" on Il Primo Uomo: Arias for Nicolini, sung by Dmitry Egorov with La Stagione Frankfurt, Michael Schneider DHM 2011

References

Sources
 Collins, Michael (ed), "Tigrane", volume VIII of The Operas of Alessandro Scarlatti (Donald Jay Grout, general editor): 1983, Harvard publications in music, 13.

Further reading
 The Viking Opera Guide, ed. Amanda Holden (Viking, 1993)
 Tigrane, Del Teatro (in Italian)]
 Il Tigrane, Magazine de l'opéra baroque (in French)]

External links

Operas by Alessandro Scarlatti
Italian-language operas
Opera seria
1715 operas
Operas set in antiquity
Operas